York Herald of Arms in Ordinary is an officer of arms at the College of Arms.  The first York Herald is believed to have been an officer to Edmund of Langley, Duke of York around the year 1385, but the first completely reliable reference to such a herald is in February 1484, when John Water alias Yorke, herald was granted certain fees by Richard III. These fees included the Manor of Bayhall in Pembury, Kent, and 8 pounds, 6 shillings, and 8 pence a year from the Lordship of Huntingfield in Kent. The badge of office is the White Rose of York en soleil ensigned by the Royal Crown.

Holders of the office

See also
 Heraldry
 Officer of Arms

References
Notes

Citations

Bibliography
 The College of Arms, Queen Victoria Street : being the sixteenth and final monograph of the London Survey Committee, Walter H. Godfrey, assisted by Sir Anthony Wagner, with a complete list of the officers of arms, prepared by H. Stanford London, (London, 1963)
 A History of the College of Arms &c, Mark Noble, (London, 1804)

External links
The College of Arms
CUHGS Officer of Arms Index

Offices of the College of Arms